James Michael McDonald (December 5, 1936 – June 2, 2012) was an American football coach. He served as the head football coach at Saint Mary's College of California from 1974 to 1976, compiling a record of 9–20.

Head coaching record

College

References

1936 births
2012 deaths
Saint Mary's Gaels football coaches
High school football coaches in California
University of San Francisco alumni